The n-universes are a conceptual tool introduced by philosopher Paul Franceschi. They consist of simplified models of universes which are reduced to their essential components, in order to facilitate the associated reasoning. In the study of thought experiments related to paradoxes and philosophical problems, the situations are generally complex and likely to give birth to multiple variations. Making use of Occam's razor, modeling in the n-universes makes it possible to reduce such situations to their essential elements and to limit accordingly the complexity of the relevant study.

The n-universes were introduced in Franceschi (2001), in the context of the study of Goodman's paradox and were also used for the analysis of the thought experiments and paradoxes related to the Doomsday argument. In the typology of n-universes, it is worth distinguishing:
- according to whether they comprise constant-criteria or/and variable-criteria (space, time, color, shape, temperature, etc.)
- according to whether they comprise one or more objects
- according to whether a given criterion is or not with demultiplication
- according to whether the objects are in relation one-one or many-one with a given criterion.

The n-universes proceed of a double inspiration: on the one hand, as a system of criteria, that of Nelson Goodman and on the other hand, at the ontological level, that of the Canadian philosopher John Leslie. The n-universes also propose to extend the properties of probability spaces classically used in probability theory (Franceschi 2006).

Example 

The N-universe represented below shows the following characteristics:
 it comprises 4 objects
 it has one variable-criterion of time (a single temporal position), one variable-criterion of location (with 4 space positions) and one variable-criterion of color (with three taxa: red, blue, green)
 the objects are in a many-one relationship to the color variable: several objects have the same color
 the objects are in many-one relationship to the time constant: several objects exist simultaneously at the single temporal position
 the objects are in one-one relationship with the space criterion: only one object exists at a given space position
 the objects are not with demultiplication with regard to the temporal criterion: the objects exist only at one single temporal position

See also 
 Possible worlds
 Many-worlds interpretation

References 
 Franceschi, Paul (2001), A Solution to Goodman's paradox English translation of a paper initially appeared in French under the title Une Solution pour le Paradoxe de Goodman], in Dialogue: Canadian Philosophical Review, vol. 40, pages 99–123.
 Franceschi, Paul (2002), Une application des n-univers à l'argument de l'apocalypse et au paradoxe de Goodman, doctoral dissertation, Corti: University of Corsica.
 Franceschi, Paul (2006), Situations probabilistes pour n-univers goodmaniens, Journal of Philosophical Research, vol. 31, pages 123-141.
 Franceschi, Paul (2009), Dialogue d'introduction aux n-univers - Introduction dialogue to n-universes, Edition 2.1, CreateSpace

Thought experiments in philosophy